FIFA Football 2004, also known as FIFA Soccer 2004 in North America, is a football simulation video game developed by EA Canada and published by Electronic Arts. It was released in October 2003 with the tagline "Create Brilliance".

FIFA Football 2004 is the eleventh game in the FIFA series and the eighth to be in 3D.

The Japanese version of FIFA Football 2004, called FIFA Total Football, was released in March 2004.

The game is an EA Sports Bio game, and is compatible with other EA Sports games like Madden NFL 2004 and NBA Live 2004.

Gameplay
While not adding much to the engine used in FIFA Football 2003, the biggest new inclusions were secondary divisions, which allow the player to take lower ranked teams to promotion attempts. Gameplay has a new feature dubbed "Off the ball", which allows the control of two players at the same time for greater tactical play. Another key feature was Football Fusion, which allows owners of both FIFA 2004 and Total Club Manager 2004 to play games from the management sim in FIFA. The title sequence was filmed in St James' Park, home of Newcastle United, with the opening song being Kings of Leon's European hit "Red Morning Light".

Players
The cover features Alessandro Del Piero of Juventus, Thierry Henry of Arsenal, and Ronaldinho in a Brazil kit.

Reception

The PlayStation 2 version of FIFA Football 2004 received a "Double Platinum" sales award from the Entertainment and Leisure Software Publishers Association (ELSPA), indicating sales of at least 600,000 copies in the United Kingdom.

The game was met with positive to average reception. GameRankings and Metacritic gave it a score of 84.20% and 82 out of 100 for the Game Boy Advance version; 83.67% and 83 out of 100 for the GameCube version; 82.50% and 82 out of 100 for the Xbox version; 81.74% and 84 out of 100 for the PlayStation 2 version; 80% and 80 out of 100 for the PlayStation version; 78% and 77 out of 100 for the PC version; and 73.60% and 72 out of 100 for the N-Gage version.

References

External links

2003 video games
Electronic Arts games
EA Sports games
Association football video games
2004
PlayStation 2 games
PlayStation (console) games
GameCube games
Xbox games
Windows games
Game Boy Advance games
N-Gage games
NuFX games
Video games developed in Canada
Video games set in 2003
Video games set in 2004
Multiplayer and single-player video games
La Liga licensed video games
BAFTA winners (video games)
Exient Entertainment games
Games with GameCube-GBA connectivity